Mayumi may refer to:

Mayumi (name)
Mayumi (film) (真由美), a 1990 South Korean film directed by Shin Sang-ok
9418 Mayumi, a minor planet